The 2010 British Figure Skating Championships took place from 23 to 28 November 2009 in Sheffield. Skaters competed in the disciplines of men's singles, ladies' singles, pair skating, and ice dancing across the levels of senior, junior, and novice. The results were among the criteria to determine the British teams for the 2010 Winter Olympics, 2010 World Championships, the 2010 European Championships, and the 2010 World Junior Championships.

Senior results

Men

 WD = Withdrawn

Ladies

 WD = Withdrawn

Pairs

Ice dancing

Junior results

Men

Ladies

Pairs

Ice dancing

Novice results

Men

Ladies

 WD = Withdrawn

Ice dancing

External links
 2010 British Figure Skating Championships results
 National Ice Skating Association

British Figure Skating Championships
2009 in figure skating
British Figure Skating Championships, 2010
Figure Skating Championships
Figure Skating Championships